Chang Jin (born July 1966) is a Chinese astronomer and the current director of Purple Mountain Observatory.

Biography
Chang was born in Taixing, Jiangsu in July 1966. He graduated from the University of Science and Technology of China.

In August 1992 he joined the Purple Mountain Observatory, where he was promoted to associate research fellow in August 1999 and to research fellow in March 2002. He joined the Communist Party of China in April 1995. He served as deputy director of the Purple Mountain Observatory from February 2014 to February 2019. In February 2019 he was appointed director of the Purple Mountain Observatory. He is also the chief scientist of China's Dark Matter Particle Explorer (DAMPE).

Honours and awards
 8 November 2018 Science and Technology Award of the Ho Leung Ho Lee Foundation
 22 November 2019 Academician of the Chinese Academy of Sciences (CAS)

References

1966 births
People from Taixing
Living people
University of Science and Technology of China alumni
20th-century Chinese astronomers
Members of the Chinese Academy of Sciences
Directors of the Purple Mountain Observatory
Scientists from Taizhou, Jiangsu
Physicists from Jiangsu
21st-century Chinese astronomers